Edward Grant (April 6, 1926 – June 21, 2020) was an American historian of medieval science. He was named a Distinguished Professor in 1983. Other honors include the 1992 George Sarton Medal, for "a lifetime scholarly achievement" as an historian of science.

Biography
Edward Grant was born in 1926. He attended City College in New York where he graduated in 1951. He continued to the University of Wisconsin where he received a Master's degree and a PhD in the History of Science and Medieval History in 1957. During this time, Grant spent a year at the University of Utrecht as a Fulbright Scholar from 1955-1956.

Grant began his successful teaching career while a graduate student at the University of Wisconsin. He was an assistant to a well-known scholar in the field Marshall Clagett, whom he would continue to respect and correspond with throughout his career. Grant taught at the University of Maine and in the history of science program at Harvard University.

In 1959, Grant came to Indiana University as an Assistant Professor of History. His teaching career spanned over thirty years at IU. He was instrumental in starting the department later to be known as History and Philosophy of Science. Grant was named Distinguished Professor of both that department and the History department. A distinguished medievalist, Grant wrote prolifically throughout his professorship at IU. Professor Grant was twice chair of his department (1973–1979; 1987–1990) where he taught courses on medieval science, natural philosophy and science and religion. Grant was given the title Distinguished Professor Emeritus, Department of History and Philosophy of Science, Indiana University.

Grant was also a prominent member of several organizations, such as the Medieval Academy of America, the International Academy of the History of Science, and the History of Science Society. He served as Vice-President of the History of Science Society from 1983-1984 and as president from 1985–86. Grant was also a frequent lecturer for organizations such as the Phi Beta Kappa Associates Panel of Distinguished Speakers from 1990-1998.

Grant received many honors and awards, including the George Sarton Medal in 1992, the most prestigious award given by the History of Science Society that "recognizes those whose entire careers have been devoted to the field and whose scholarship is exceptional."

Work
In his book The Foundations of Modern Science in the Middle Ages: Their Religious, Institutional and Intellectual Contexts, Grant discussed the developments and discoveries that culminated in the Scientific Revolution of the 17th century. He emphasized how the roots of modern science were planted in the ancient and medieval worlds long before the modern period, and that the Christian Latin civilization of Western Europe began the last stage of its intellectual development. One basic factor was how Christianity developed in the West with the establishment of the medieval universities around 1200.

In God and Reason in the Middle Ages he argued that the Middle Ages had acquired an undeserved reputation as an age of superstition, barbarism, and unreason.

Selected publications
Edward Grant published more than ninety articles and twelve books, including:
 Physical Science in the Middle Ages (1971)
 Much Ado About Nothing: Theories of Space and Vacuum from the Middle Ages to the Scientific Revolution (1981)
 Planets, Stars, & Orbs: The Medieval Cosmos, 1200–1687 (1994)
 The Foundations of Modern Science in the Middle Ages (1996)
 God and Reason in the Middle Ages (2001)
 Science and Religion, 400 B.C. to A.D. 1550: From Aristotle to Copernicus (2004)
 A History of Natural Philosophy from the Ancient World to the Nineteenth Century (2007)

References

External links
 Harvard University Press
Edward Grant papers, 1950-2001 at the Indiana University Archives.

American historians of science
Indiana University faculty
University of Maine faculty
Harvard University faculty
2020 deaths
Philosophers of science
1926 births
Historians from Indiana